Curlew Air Force Station (ADC ID: LP-6, P-6) is a closed United States Air Force General Surveillance Radar station. It was closed in 1959.

History
Curlew Air Force Station was one of twenty-eight stations built as part of the second segment of the Air Defense Command permanent radar network. Prompted by the start of the Korean War, on July 11, 1950, the Secretary of the Air Force asked the Secretary of Defense for approval to expedite construction of the permanent network. Receiving the Defense Secretary's approval on July 21, the Air Force directed the Corps of Engineers to proceed with construction.

The 638th Tactical Control Squadron was redesignated as the 638th Aircraft Control and Warning Squadron and activated at Mount Bonaparte AFS (LP-6), Washington on 5 May 1950.  By March 1951 the squadron was operating an AN/TPS-1B medium-range search radar, and initially the station functioned as a Ground-Control Intercept (GCI) and warning station.  As a GCI station, the squadron's role was to guide interceptor aircraft toward unidentified intruders picked up on the unit's radar scopes.

The permanent site (P-6) was moved to Bodie Mountain (Curlew AFS) on 1 December 1953, and the 638th AC&W Squadron began operating an AN/FPS-3 long-range search radar and an AN/FPS-5 height-finder radar beginning in January 1952. An AN/FPS-6 height-finder radar was installed in 1957.   In 1959 the 638th AC&W Squadron was inactivated, and the station was converted to an unmanned gap-filler radar site (P-60C) to support Colville AFS (P-60) until the site was finally closed in December 1960.

Today, the radar site itself is obliterated, a few foundations and some crumbling concrete is all that remains. The cantonment area is  used as a Job Corps center, known as the Curlew Civilian Conservation Center.

Air Force units and assignments 
Units:
 Former 638th Tactical Control Squadron redesignated 638th Aircraft Control and Warning Squadron
 Activated at Mount Bonaparte, WA 15 May 1950
 Site renamed Curlew Air Force Station, 1 December 1953
 Inactivated on 1 December 1959

Assignments:
 505th Aircraft Control and Warning Group, 15 May 1950
 162d Aircraft Control and Warning Group (Federalized AZ ANG), 25 May 1951
 25th Air Division, 6 February 1952
 4702d Defense Wing, 1 January 1953
 9th Air Division, 8 October 1954
 25th Air Division, 15 August 1958
 4700th Air Defense Wing, 1 September 1958 – 1 December 1959

See also
 List of USAF Aerospace Defense Command General Surveillance Radar Stations
 List of United States Air Force aircraft control and warning squadrons

References

 
 
 Information for Curlew AFS, WA

Installations of the United States Air Force in Washington (state)
Radar stations of the United States Air Force
Aerospace Defense Command military installations
1951 establishments in Washington (state)
1959 disestablishments in Washington (state)
Military installations established in 1951
Military installations closed in 1959